Kazuo railway station is a railway station of Jingshen Passenger Railway located in Harqin Zuoyi Mongol Autonomous County, Chaoyang, Liaoning, People's Republic of China.

Railway stations in Liaoning
Stations on the Beijing–Harbin High-Speed Railway